Faces are the front areas of heads.

Faces may also refer to:

Computing and Internet
 Faces (video game), a 1990 computer game
 JavaServer Faces, a Java-based Web application framework for interfaces
 faces for Unix, the continuation of vismon

Film and television
 Faces (1934 film), a British drama film
 Faces (1968 film), a film by John Cassavetes
 "Faces" (Star Trek: Voyager), an episode of Star Trek: Voyager
 "Faces", an episode of The Good Doctor

Music
 Faces (band), a British rock band active in the early 1970s
 Faces (festival) a music festival in Raseborg, Finland since 1998

Albums
 Faces (Clarke-Boland Big Band album) (1969)
 Faces (Gábor Szabó album) (1977)
 Faces (Earth, Wind & Fire album) (1980)
 Faces (John Berry album) (1996)
 Faces (Chris Caffery album) (2005)
 Faces (Mt. Helium album) (2008)
 Faces (EP), by Residual Kid (2012)
 Faces (mixtape), by Mac Miller (2014) 
 Faces (Irma album) (2014)
 Faces (David Lyttle album) (2015)

Songs
 "Faces" (Nik Kershaw song) (1984)
 "Faces", by Night Ranger from 7 Wishes (1985) 
 "Faces" (Run-D.M.C. song) (1991)
 "Faces" (2 Unlimited song) (1993)
 "Faces", by Cat Power from Myra Lee (1996)
 "Faces" (Candyland and Shoffy song) (2016)
 "Faces", by Gavin James (2019)
 "Faces", by Scary Kids Scaring Kids from their eponymous album (2007)
 "Faces", by Young Thug from Punk (2021)

See also
 Face (disambiguation)
 Faeces
 Wong-Baker Faces Pain Rating Scale